Cyclopropenone is an organic compound with molecular formula C3H2O consisting of a cyclopropene carbon framework with a ketone functional group.  It is a colorless, volatile liquid that boils near room temperature. Neat cyclopropenone polymerizes upon standing at room temperature. The chemical properties of the compound are dominated by the strong polarization of the carbonyl group, which gives a partial positive charge with aromatic stabilization on the ring and a partial negative charge on oxygen. It is an aromatic compound.

See also 
Diphenylcyclopropenone
Deltic acid
Tropone

References

Enones
Simple aromatic rings
Cyclopropenes
Non-benzenoid aromatic carbocycles